The 2016 LFL US season was the seventh season of the Legends Football League in the United States. The season featured eight teams from across the US in two four team conference. During the regular season each team played each other team in their conference once, and a single cross conference game. The top two teams from each conference then played a single elimination game to qualify for the Legends Cup final in Scottsdale, Arizona.

Developments 
The Las Vegas Sin did not participate in the 2016 LFL season, citing an inability to find a suitable home venue. Three teams joined the LFL, the Austin Acoustic, Dallas Desire, and New England Liberty. The Acoustic and Liberty were newcomers to the LFL while the Desire had played in Lingerie Bowls II and III and in the league between 2009 and 2012.

Schedule

Playoffs

Standings

Eastern Conference

Western Conference

Playoffs 
The Conference Championship games were held on Saturday, August 20 at the ShoWare Center in Kent, Washington.  The hometown Seattle Mist won the Western Conference title, defeating the expansion Dallas Desire 44-6 in a rematch of an earlier game at Dallas in which the Desire prevailed.  The Eastern Conference title game featured the Chicago Bliss versus the Atlanta Steam.  Atlanta took a commanding 25-8 lead into the half but Chicago rallied, shutting out Atlanta in the second half to earn their fourth straight appearance in the Legends Cup with a 30-25 victory.

The 2016 Legends Cup was held on Saturday, August 27 at WestWorld in Scottsdale, Arizona between the defending champion Seattle Mist and the previous two-time champion Chicago Bliss, a rematch of an early season game which was won by the Mist.  Seattle scored on the opening drive to take a 6-0 lead.  Chicago tied the game but the Mist scored again to close the opening quarter and then once more to go up 18-6.  As they did in the playoffs against Atlanta, Chicago rallied, closing the gap and taking the lead 19-18 just before the half.  Chicago scored again near the end of the third period to extend their lead to 25-18.  Seattle opened the fourth quarter with a score to retake the lead 26-25 but Chicago responded with a touchdown of their own.  Chicago's defense then stopped Seattle and claimed the victory 31-26 to win their third Legends Cup championship in four years. Chicago quarterback Jacinda Barclay captured her first LFL championship in the United States, her second overall having won the title in the 2013-2014 inaugural season of LFL Australia.

Notes 
1.  New England was forced to forfeit their final game of the season, due to being unable to field a team.

References

External links 
 Legends Football League official site

Lingerie Football League
Legends Football League